Sheep Mountain Wilderness is a wilderness area of  within the San Gabriel Mountains National Monument and managed by the Angeles National Forest. It is within Los Angeles County and San Bernardino County, southern California.

The U.S. Congress passed the California Wilderness Act of 1984, which created this wilderness area and added it to the National Wilderness Preservation System.

The wilderness includes Iron Mountain, an 8,007 ft (2,441 m) peak.

Recreation
Notable hiking in the area includes Heaton Flat along the East Fork of the San Gabriel River to Bridge to Nowhere. Also popular for hikes is the trail to the  Big Horn Mine, which was purchased from the owner in 2006 by the Wilderness Land Trust, and incorporated into the wilderness after being transferred to the US Forest Service.

See also

Notes

San Gabriel Mountains
Angeles National Forest
San Gabriel Mountains National Monument
Protected areas of Los Angeles County, California
Protected areas of San Bernardino County, California
Wilderness areas of California